David Child Moor (born 18 December 1934) is an English former first-class cricketer.

Moor was born at Faversham in December 1934.  He later studied at Trinity College, Oxford where he played first-class cricket for Oxford University in 1956. He made three appearances, all at Oxford against Yorkshire, Hampshire and Lancashire. He scored 44 runs in his three matches, with a high score of 22.

References

External links

1934 births
Living people
People from Faversham
Alumni of Trinity College, Oxford
English cricketers
Oxford University cricketers